John Tui (pronounced two-we; born 11 June 1975) is a New Zealand actor of Tongan descent. He is known for his roles as Anubis "Doggie" Cruger in Power Rangers S.P.D. and as Daggeron in Power Rangers Mystic Force, both filmed in his native New Zealand. He has since transitioned to roles in Hollywood projects such as Hobbs & Shaw and Young Rock.

Tui was born in Auckland, New Zealand. He grew up in Manurewa, New Zealand. In 2002, Tui married Liyah. He has four children, including twin sons.

Filmography

Film

Television

Short films

Theatre

References

External links

 
 https://web.archive.org/web/20060823180308/http://www.actors.co.nz/people/viewAnybody.aspx?anybodyId=615

New Zealand male voice actors
New Zealand people of Tongan descent
Living people
New Zealand male film actors
New Zealand male television actors
New Zealand male soap opera actors
1975 births
21st-century New Zealand male actors